Kuin or KUIN may refer to:
 Kuin, Alborz, Iran
 Kuin, Fars, Iran
 Quincy Regional Airport, ICAO code KUIN
 Kuin or kuri (kitchen), the building housing the kitchen of a Zen temple